Bad Boys (stylized as BADBOYS) is a manga series written and illustrated by Hiroshi Tanaka. It was adapted into an OVA and a live action film and it was adapted into a Japanese television drama series. As for 2021, the manga has sold 55 million copies.

Characters
 Tsukasa Kiriki (Kento Nakajima, TV series)
 Jouji Kawanaka (Kenyu Horiuchi, TV series)

References

External links
 Official film website 
 Official TV series website 
 
 

2013 Japanese television series debuts
Live-action films based on manga
J.C.Staff
Japanese television dramas based on manga
Manga adapted into films
Nippon TV dramas
Seinen manga
Shōnen Gahōsha manga
Yankī anime and manga
2010s Japanese films